The men's 1 mile freestyle was a swimming event held as part of the Swimming at the 1904 Summer Olympics programme. It was the first time the event was held at such a distance at the Olympics and the only time the mile was used; later incarnations of the event used 1500 metres as the distance.

7 swimmers from 5 nations competed.

Results

Final

References

Sources
 

Swimming at the 1904 Summer Olympics